Barrow Hall is an 18th-century residential building and a Grade I listed building in Barrow-upon-Humber, North Lincolnshire, England.

History
The Hall was built in 1789 for George Uppleby, a barrister. The original building was built in red bricks in flemish bond with a Welsh slate roof. The site is currently used as a care home.

References

18th-century establishments in England
Buildings and structures in Lincolnshire
Grade I listed buildings in Lincolnshire
1789 establishments in England